Moser Farm, also known as The Mennonite Heritage Farm or Adirondack Mennonite Heritage Farm, is a historic farm complex located near Kirschnerville in Lewis County, New York. The complex consists of Moser family dwelling and a compact grouping of a granary and two English barns. The frame dwelling was built in 1845 and consists of a 2-story, three-bay block and four-bay, -story ell. It was used for Mennonite worship services in the 19th century. The granary dates to the mid- to late 19th century, and the barns date to 1874. The property was purchased in the 1980s as a living history museum.

It was listed on the National Register of Historic Places in 2010.

References

External links
Adirondack Mennonite Heritage Farm

Farms on the National Register of Historic Places in New York (state)
Houses completed in 1845
Historic house museums in New York (state)
Museums in Lewis County, New York
Religious museums in New York (state)
Mennonitism in the United States
National Register of Historic Places in Lewis County, New York